Valeria De Pretto (born November 16, 1991) is an Italian basketball player for Cestistica Spezzina and the Italian national team.

She participated at the EuroBasket Women 2017.

References

1991 births
Living people
Italian women's basketball players
Small forwards
21st-century Italian women